"Don't Shoot" is a single by American rapper the Game, featuring Rick Ross, 2 Chainz, Diddy, Fabolous, Wale, DJ Khaled, Swizz Beatz, Yo Gotti, Curren$y, Problem, King  and recording group TGT performing the chorus. The Game's daughter also joins in at the end but is uncredited. The song is a tribute to Michael Brown.

Background 
The song was released in the United States on August 27, 2014. A number of other songs came out soon after the furor over the shooting of Michael Brown and perceived similar incidents, such as "Be Free" by J. Cole and "Black Rage" by Lauryn Hill. "Don't Shoot" mentions other black men killed under notorious circumstances, such as Emmett Till, Ezell Ford, Trayvon Martin, and Sean Bell.

Charts

References 

2014 singles
2014 songs
All-star recordings
The Game (rapper) songs
Rick Ross songs
2 Chainz songs
Sean Combs songs
Fabolous songs
Wale (rapper) songs
DJ Khaled songs
Swizz Beatz songs
Yo Gotti songs
Currensy songs
Protest songs
Songs about police brutality
Shooting of Michael Brown
Songs written by The Game (rapper)
Songs written by Rick Ross
Songs written by 2 Chainz
Songs written by Sean Combs
Songs written by Fabolous
Songs written by Wale (rapper)
Songs written by DJ Khaled
Songs written by Swizz Beatz
Songs written by Yo Gotti
Songs written by Problem (rapper)